A body kit or bodykit is a set of modified body parts or additional components that install on a stock car. Typically composed of front and rear bumpers, side skirts, spoilers, bonnets (bonnet scoop), and sometimes front and rear side guards and roof scoops. There are many companies that offer alternatives to the original factory appearance of the vehicle. Body kit components are designed to complement each other and work together as a complete design. Despite this, the 'mix and match' approach is often seen on cars, where the front of one body kit will be matched with the rear of another, for example.

Automotive body kits are usually constructed of either fiberglass, polyurethane, or in some cases carbon fiber. Fiberglass is cheap and widely available, although it can crack upon impact. Polyurethane is popular because it is flexible and thus more resistant to damage. Carbon fiber body kits are rare, due to the cost of the materials, and are rarely seen on street-legal vehicles.

Factory-fitted body kits are now becoming more common, perhaps in response to the growth of the aftermarket tuning industry in the late 1990s and onwards. Many manufacturers now work in-house with their motor sport divisions to develop styling upgrades (such as HSV). Well-known body kit brands include Veilside, Mansory, Novitec Group, Hamann Motorsport, Liberty Walk and Rocket Bunny.

Body kit history
The roots of the modern body kits go the beginning of the first part of the 20th century. With growing popularity of custom cars in America many car enthusiasts were looking to alter the appearance of their vehicles in order to improve the performance characteristics or make a car look different from the others (styling statement). Motorsport engineering also influenced the development of vehicle's body modifications, because certain changes in the construction of stock body parts allowed to achieve better results in terms of performance. Bumpers with bigger air dams and hood scoops deliver more fresh air to the engine which results in better performance output and heat reduction. Wide fenders or bolt-on flares allow to clear wider wheels. Trunk spoilers, bumper lips and bumper splitters reduce or properly distribute the down force which improves the overall air dynamics of a vehicle. 
Body kits are used on cars, SUV and trucks.

Common body kit components
 Front and rear bumper (car)
 Side skirts (rockers)
 Bumper lips
 Bumper canards
 Bumper diffusers
 Bumper splitters
 Bumper grilles
 Fenders with vents
 Fender flares
 Widebody fenders and quarterpanels
 Spoilers
 Custom hoods
 Hood Scoops
 Roof scoops
 Side scoops
 Window louvers
 One piece front end
 One piece rear end

Popular culture
In video games like Battle Gear (1996-2006), Initial D Arcade Stage (2002-Present), Street Legal (2002), Street Legal Racing: Redline (2003), Need for Speed: Underground (2003) and beyond, Tokyo Xtreme Racer 3 (2003), Grand Theft Auto: San Andreas (2004), Street Racing Syndicate (2004), Midnight Club 3: Dub Edition (2005) Ridge Racer 7 (2006), Juiced series (2005), RPM Tuning (2005), Wangan Midnight (2004-Present), L.A. Street Racing (2006), The Fast And The Furious (2006), MotorStorm: Arctic Edge (2009), Need for Speed: No Limits (Smartphone, 2015), Forza series CSR Racing 2, and the Asphalt 9: Legends etc., the vehicles can be modified in many ways, including with body kits.

An Infiniti G35 upgraded with a Vaydor body kit appeared in the 2016 Batman movie Suicide Squad.

See also
 Car tuning
 Hot rod
 Stance (vehicle)
 Veilside
 Import scene
 SEMA
 Custom car
 Aftermarket (automotive)
 Downforce
 Bumper (car)
 Spoiler (car)
 Kit car
 Pimp My Ride'', a television series about vehicle restoration and modification that uses body kits extensively

References

Automotive accessories
Vehicle modifications